The College of Applied Science and Technology (also called AZCAST or CAST) is a remote campus of the University of Arizona, located in Sierra Vista. The campus offers master's degrees, bachelor's degrees, and certifications that are regionally relevant for both Southern Arizona and the United States Army Intelligence Center of Excellence (USAICoE) and the United States Army Enterprise Technology Command (NETCOM) at Fort Huachuca. The Defense Intelligence Agency (DIA) has designated the University of Arizona's Intelligence program as an Intelligence Community - Center of Academic Excellence (IC-CAE).

Degrees offered

Undergraduate

Bachelor of Arts
Government and Public Service
Psychology

Bachelor of Applied Science
Administration of Justice
Applied Computing
Digital Design
Information Management
Network Operations
Software Development
Cyber Operations
Cyber Engineering
Cyber Law and Policy
Defense and Forensics
Early Childhood Education
Human Services
Intelligence & Information Operations
Information Warfare
Law Enforcement Intelligence
Operational Intelligence
Meteorology
Network Operations
Organizational Leadership & Regional Commerce
Organizational Leadership
Regional Commerce

Bachelor of Science
Computer Science
Elementary Education

Graduate

Master Degree
M.ED. Secondary Education
M.S. Educational Technology

Certifications
Cyber Operations
Cyber Security
Instructional Design & Tech
Military Families

References

External links
 Official website

1995 establishments in Arizona
Educational institutions established in 1995